The Valea Stanciului is a left tributary of the river Săcuieu in Romania. It flows into the Săcuieu in Răchițele. The river valley is known for its gorge Cheile Văii Stanciului and the Vălul Miresei waterfalls.

References

Rivers of Romania
Rivers of Cluj County